KSAM-FM is a radio station airing a country music format licensed to Huntsville, Texas, broadcasting on 101.7 MHz FM.  The station is owned by HEH Communications, LLC.

References

External links

Country radio stations in the United States
SAM